Booker (foaled 26 August 2014) is a Group 1 winning Australian thoroughbred racehorse.

Background
Booker was sold for A$230,000 at the 2016 Inglis Australian Premier Yearling Sale.

Racing career
In 2019, Booker won the Group 1 Oakleigh Plate at Caulfield Racecourse at odds of 18/1.

Breeding career

After retiring from racing in 2020, Booker was sold to Coolmore Stud as a broodmare for A$1,600,000.

Booker gave birth to her first foal in 2021, a colt by stallion I Am Invincible.

Pedigree

References 

Racehorses bred in Australia
Racehorses trained in Australia
Thoroughbred family 7-e
2014 racehorse births